Kalininsky (masculine), Kalininskaya (feminine), or Kalininskoye (neuter) is the name of several rural localities in Russia:
Kalininsky, Altai Krai, a settlement in Soloneshensky District of Altai Krai
Kalininsky, name of several other rural localities
Kalininskaya, Krasnodar Krai, a stanitsa in Kalininsky District of Krasnodar Krai
Kalininskaya, Rostov Oblast, a stanitsa in Tsimlyansky District of Rostov Oblast
Kalininskaya, name of several other rural localities
Kalininskoye, Republic of Bashkortostan, a village in Iglinsky District of the Republic of Bashkortostan
Kalininskoye, name of several other rural localities